The 2019–20 Northern Counties East Football League season was the 38th in the history of Northern Counties East Football League, a football competition in England.

The allocations for Steps 1 to 6 for season 2019–20 were announced by the FA on 19 May. These were subject to appeal, and the Northern Counties East's constitution was ratified at the league's AGM on 15 June.

As a result of the COVID-19 pandemic, this season's competition was formally abandoned on 26 March 2020, with all results from the season being expunged, and no promotion or relegation taking place to, from, or within the competition. On 30 March 2020, sixty-six non-league clubs sent an open letter to the Football Association requesting that they reconsider their decision.

Premier Division

The Premier Division featured 17 clubs which competed in the previous season, along with three new clubs:
 Grimsby Borough, promoted from Division One
 AFC Mansfield, voluntary demoted from the Northern Premier League
 Silsden, transferred from the North West Counties League

League table

Stadia and locations

Division One

Division One featured 15 clubs which competed in the previous season, along with three new clubs:
 Brigg Town, promoted from the Lincolnshire League
 Hall Road Rangers, relegated from the Premier Division
 Harrogate Railway Athletic, relegated from the Premier Division
 North Ferriby, new club formed after North Ferriby United folded
 Retford, promoted from the Central Midlands League

Also, East Yorkshire Carnegie were renamed as East Hull.

League table

Results

Stadia & locations

League Cup

The 2019–20 Northern Counties East Football League League Cup is the 37th season of the league cup competition of the Northern Counties East Football League.

References

External links
 Northern Counties East Football League

2019–20
9
Association football events curtailed and voided due to the COVID-19 pandemic